Institute of Computational Mathematics and Mathematical Geophysics of the Siberian Branch of the RAS, ICMMG SB RAS is a research institute in Novosibirsk, Russia. It was founded in 1964.

History
On January 1, 1964, the Computing Center was established in Novosibirsk, later it was transformed into the Institute of Computational Mathematics and Mathematical Geophysics.

In 2004, the institute has created an Expert Database on Tsunami Observations in the Pacific Ocean containing information on 1500 tsunamigenic events that have occurred in the Pacific region between 47 BC and 2003.

Activities
Research in the field of mathematical modeling of oceanic and atmospheric physics, environmental protection, geophysics, telecommunication systems and software for supercomputers etc.

References

External links
 Институт вычислительной математики и математической геофизики СО РАН. Портал СО РАН.
 Official website.

Research institutes in Novosibirsk
1964 establishments in the Soviet Union
Research institutes established in 1964
Research institutes in the Soviet Union
Computer science institutes
Geophysics organizations